Anna Rossomando (born 30 June 1963) is an Italian politician from the Democratic Party, vice president of the Senate since 2018.

Biography 
Born in Turin, the city where she currently lives, Rossomando graduated with a degree in law from the University of Turin in 1989. She worked as a criminal lawyer and holds a law firm based in Turin.

In 1977, at the age of 14, Rossomando joined the Italian Communist Youth Federation, the youth wing of the Italian Communist Party of which she later became a member. She remained in the party even through its transformations into the Democratic Party of the Left, Democrats of the Left and finally the Democratic Party.

From 1997 to 2006, Rossomando was a city councilor in Turin during the second mayoral term of Valentino Castellani and the first mayoral term of Sergio Chiamparino.

At the 2008 general election, Rossomando was elected to the Chamber of Deputies, being re-elected at the following election. At the 2018 election, Rossomando was elected to the Senate and became vice president of the Senate.

A member of the left wing of the Democratic Party, Rossomando gave her support to Andrea Orlando during the 2017 primary election and to Nicola Zingaretti at the 2019 primary election.

References

External links 
Files about her parliamentary activities (in Italian): XVI, XVII, XVIII legislature.

1963 births
Living people
Turin communal councillors
Italian Communist Party politicians
Democratic Party of the Left politicians
Democrats of the Left politicians
Democratic Party (Italy) politicians
20th-century Italian women politicians
21st-century Italian women politicians
University of Turin alumni
Deputies of Legislature XVI of Italy
Deputies of Legislature XVII of Italy
Senators of Legislature XVIII of Italy
Vice presidents of the Senate (Italy)
20th-century Italian women
Women members of the Chamber of Deputies (Italy)
Women members of the Senate of the Republic (Italy)